The 1949 Walker Cup, the 12th Walker Cup Match, was played on August 19 and 20, 1949, on the West course at Winged Foot Golf Club, Mamaroneck, New York. The United States won by 10 matches to 2.

Format
Four 36-hole matches of foursomes were played on Friday and eight singles matches on Saturday. Each of the 12 matches was worth one point in the larger team competition. If a match was all square after the 36th hole extra holes were not played. The team with most points won the competition. If the two teams were tied, the previous winner would retain the trophy.

Teams
Ten players for the United States and Great Britain & Ireland participated in the event. Great Britain & Ireland had a playing captain, while the United States had a non-playing captain. Laddie Lucas, the Great Britain and Ireland playing captain, did not select himself or Bunny Millward for any of the matches.

United States

Captain: Francis Ouimet
Ray Billows
Ted Bishop
Charles Coe
Johnny Dawson
Chuck Kocsis
Bruce McCormick
Jim McHale Jr.
Skee Riegel
Frank Stranahan
Willie Turnesa

Great Britain & Ireland
 & 
Playing captain:  Laddie Lucas
 Jimmy Bruen
 Joe Carr
 Cecil Ewing
 Max McCready
 Gerald Micklem
 Bunny Millward
 Arthur Perowne
 Ken Thom
 Ronnie White

Friday's foursomes

Saturday's singles

References

Walker Cup
Golf in New York (state)
Walker Cup
Walker Cup
Walker Cup
Walker Cup